ISAT (Innovative Space-based radar Antenna Technology) is a spacecraft developed by the U.S. Air Force Research Laboratory's Space Vehicles Directorate to test technology for intelligence, surveillance, and reconnaissance spacecraft.

The ISAT program is developing technologies that enable the deployment of extremely large electronically scanning antennas in space, and the metrology and calibration technologies necessary for coherent beamforming from such large antennas. These huge antennas enable the revolutionary performance required to conduct tactical sensing from space, including missions like continuous reliable tracking of surface targets.

References 

Reconnaissance satellites of the United States
Space radars
Military space program of the United States
Spacecraft launched in 2019
SpaceX commercial payloads